Bill Harrigan (born 24 May 1960 in Sydney, New South Wales) is an Australian former rugby league football referee, and former head of refereeing for the National Rugby League. Unusually for a sports official, in his long career he was accorded the same profile as some of the top players he refereed. A policeman off-field before he resigned to concentrate on rugby league, he is widely recognised as one of Australia's greatest sports umpires. He retired with the record for most State of Origin matches officiated.

Early life
William James "Bill" Harrigan was born in 1960 in the Western Suburbs of Sydney, New South Wales. He resided in the south-west and greater western suburbs of Sydney for all of his childhood. While not particularly interested in academic studies as school student, he nevertheless represented his schools with distinction in every sport that he could. He attended Fairvale High School before graduating in 1977. Harrigan joined the NSW Police Force in 1979. He served extensively in numerous units, including the Tactical Response Group.

Rugby League career
Harrigan refereed his first game in 1977. In 1986 he refereed his first New South Wales Rugby League premiership match, between Cronulla and Western Suburbs.

Harrigan holds the following Australian rugby league refereeing records
393 first grade games,
21 State of Origin games,
25 Test matches, and
10 Grand finals (1989–1991,1997–2003)

Defamation action
In July 2001 Harrigan successfully sued Australian radio broadcaster Alan Jones for defamatory remarks made by Jones during a 1998 interview, resulting in an award of $90,000.

Post-retirement
After retiring from rugby league refereeing, Harrigan was a referee in Gladiators.

References

Further reading

External links
Image from the collection of the National Museum of Australia – Harrigan sends off Gorden Tallis during the 2000 "State of Origin" series
https://web.archive.org/web/20090106141703/http://www.billharrigan.com.au/Referee-career-pg2853.html
http://www.mediaman.com.au/profiles/harrigan.html
http://www.claxtonspeakers.com.au/speakers_profile/134
http://tvnz.co.nz/view/page/411317/453852
https://web.archive.org/web/20071014012924/http://gallery.atwone.com/1023.html
http://www.seniorlink.co.nz/llbooks/?cont_id=82
https://web.archive.org/web/20050617172518/http://www.ovations.com.au/news/november.htm
http://www.smh.com.au/articles/2003/09/30/1064819935828.html
 Personal website

1960 births
Australian police officers
Living people
National Rugby League referees
Rugby league players from Sydney
Australian rugby league referees
Rugby League World Cup referees